Lachlan Ilias (born 9 May 2000) is a  international rugby league footballer who plays as a  for the South Sydney Rabbitohs in the NRL.

Background
Ilias is of Greek heritage. He grew up in the Sydney suburb of Five Dock. He played schoolboy rugby union for Trinity Grammar.
He also played junior rugby league with Five Dock Dockers in the Balmain junior district.

Career

Early career
Ilias signed a development contract with Wests Tigers in 2017. In 2018, after a meeting with Anthony Seibold, Ilias transferred to the South Sydney Rabbitohs for the 2019 season.

2021

2022
In round 15 of the 2022 NRL season, Ilias was substituted shortly after half-time during South Sydney's 32-12 loss against St. George Illawarra.  South Sydney were down 32-0 at half-time and Ilias had knocked the ball on from the opening kick off.
Ilias played 26 games for South Sydney in the 2022 NRL season including all three of the clubs finals matches as they reached the preliminary final for a fifth straight season.  Souths would lose in the preliminary final to eventual premiers Penrith 32-12.
Ilias made his international debut for  against  on 17 October 2022 at the 2021 Rugby League World Cup.

References

External links
Rabbitohs profile
Greece profile

2000 births
Living people
Greek rugby league players
Australian rugby league players
Australian people of Greek descent
Greece national rugby league team players
South Sydney Rabbitohs players
Rugby league halfbacks
Rugby league five-eighths
Rugby league players from Sydney
People educated at Trinity Grammar School (New South Wales)